Delias poecilea is a butterfly in the family Pieridae. It was described by Samuel Constantinus Snellen van Vollenhoven in 1865. It is found in the Australasian realm.

The wingspan is about 62–70 mm. It is one of the largest species of the genus Delias. The female is quite dark and resembles the females of some of the isse and dorimene species groups.

Subspecies
D. p. poecilea (Halmahera, Bachan, Kasiruta, Mandioli)
D. p. makikoae Yagishita, 1993 (Morotai)

References

External links
Delias at Markku Savela's Lepidoptera and Some Other Life Forms

poecilea
Butterflies described in 1865
Taxa named by Samuel Constantinus Snellen van Vollenhoven